Mahmoud Mohamed Siblini (born 15 July 1993) is a Lebanese footballer who plays as a striker for  club Ahed.

Starting his career at Ahli Saida in 2011, Siblini moved to Nejmeh in 2014 before being sent on a season-long loan to Tadamon Sour in 2017. After having finished joint-top scorer of the 2021–22 Lebanese Premier League, Siblini joined Ahed in 2022.

Having already represented Lebanon internationally at youth level, Siblini debuted for the senior team in 2014.

Club career 
Siblini started his club career at his hometown club Ahli Saida during the 2011–12 Lebanese Premier League, playing 18 games and scoring one goal. Despite finishing in last place and being relegated to the Lebanese Second Division, Siblini remained at the club for two further seasons.

On 13 August 2014, Siblini moved to Nejmeh, scoring one league goal in eight games, and winning the Lebanese Elite Cup and Lebanese Super Cup.  The following season, in 2015–16, Siblini scored four league goals in 17 games, and helped his side win the Lebanese FA Cup. On 9 April 2016, Siblini sustained an ACL injury, ruling him out for the majority of the 2016–17 season.

In August 2017, he was sent on a season-long loan to Tadamon Sour, where he scored one goal in 17 games. Upon his return to Nejmeh, Siblini went through another ACL injury on 23 May 2018, in a 2018–19 Arab Club Champions Cup match against Tunisian club Club Africain. He recovered over seven months later, in January 2019.

Siblini scored 10 goals in the 2021–22 Lebanese Premier League, and finished top scorer of the season, joint with Fadel Antar. With his contract due to expire in the summer, in May 2022 Ahed's president Tamim Sleiman confirmed that he had signed Siblini on a free transfer on a three-year contract. Siblini officially joined on 2 June.

International career 
A youth international for Lebanon at under-19 and under-23 levels, Siblini made his senior debut on 14 October 2014 in a 1–1 friendly draw against Saudi Arabia. He scored his first goal on his second game for Lebanon, on 6 November 2014, in a 3–2 defeat to the United Arab Emirates.

Personal life 
On 15 February 2021, Siblini and his Nejmeh teammate Mohamad Salem were involved in a car crash on their way to training; they only suffered a few bruises.

Career statistics

International 

Scores and results list Lebanon's goal tally first, score column indicates score after each Siblini goal.

Honours 
Nejmeh
 Lebanese FA Cup: 2015–16, 2021–22; runner-up: 2020–21
 Lebanese Elite Cup: 2014, 2016, 2018, 2021
 Lebanese Super Cup: 2014, 2016; runner-up: 2021

Ahed
 Lebanese Elite Cup: 2022

Individual
 Lebanese Premier League top goalscorer: 2021–22

Notes

References

External links

 
 
 

1993 births
Living people
People from Sidon District
Lebanese footballers
Association football forwards
Lebanese Premier League players
Lebanese Second Division players
Al Ahli Saida SC players
Nejmeh SC players
Tadamon Sour SC players
Al Ahed FC players
Lebanon youth international footballers
Lebanon international footballers
Lebanese Premier League top scorers